Honda Cub may refer to:
 The Honda Cub F, a 1952–1954 motorized bicycle.
 The Honda Super Cub, a motorcycle made since 1958.
 The Honda CR110 or Cub Racer, a privateer version of the RC110 Grand Prix racing motorcycle, made in 1961